Ryan Clampin (born 29 January 1999) is an English professional footballer who plays as a left back or left winger for Scottish Championship club Dundee, on loan from League Two club Colchester United.

Clampin has been with the Colchester United Academy since he was an under-9 player. He spent the 2017–18 season on loan at Maldon & Tiptree. He made his professional debut for Colchester in September 2018.

Career
Born in Colchester, Clampin is a left winger who joined Colchester United's Academy at the under-9 age group stage.

Clampin joined Isthmian League North Division side Maldon & Tiptree, initially on work experience loan from Colchester on 18 August 2017. He made his club debut on 26 August and scored in the 3–2 defeat to Hertford Town. He scored a first-half hat-trick on 26 September as the Jammers beat Brentwood Town 5–2. He scored ten goals in 41 appearances across the season for the club.

Clampin signed a new one-year contract with Colchester in May 2018.

On 4 September 2018, Clampin made his professional debut in the EFL Trophy as a substitute for Brennan Dickenson in Colchester's 2–0 defeat to Southampton Under-21s.

Clampin signed a new contract on 8 January 2019 to tie him to the club until summer 2021.

On 17 August 2019, Clampin made his full League Two debut in Colchester's 2–1 defeat by Cambridge United. He scored his first goal for Colchester in an EFL Trophy tie against Ipswich Town on 12 November 2019, the only goal of the game.

Clampin signed a new two-year contract with the club on 11 June 2021.

Dundee (loan) 
On 27 January 2023, Clampin joined Scottish Championship club Dundee on loan until the end of the season. He would make his debut for the Dark Blues the following day as a substitute, and would notch an assist in a 3–0 win over league leaders Queen's Park.

Career statistics

References

1999 births
Living people
Sportspeople from Colchester
English footballers
Association football wingers
Colchester United F.C. players
Maldon & Tiptree F.C. players
Isthmian League players
English Football League players
Scottish Professional Football League players
Dundee F.C. players